Shahid Beheshti Metro Station is a station on Tabriz Metro Line 1. The station opened on 25 September 2016. It is located in central area of Tabriz, on Beheshti Square.

References

Tabriz Metro stations